Aare Victor Leikola (29 April 1893, in Artjärvi – 21 June 1973; surname until 1906 Leidenius) was a Finnish engineer, business executive and politician. He was a member of the Parliament of Finland from 1951 to 1958, representing the People's Party of Finland. He subsequently joined the Liberal League and when the Liberal League and the People's Party of Finland merged in 1965 to form the Liberal People's Party, he founded the Independence Party (Itsenäisyyspuolue), which took part in the parliamentary elections of 1966 without winning any seats. Leikola was the chairman of the Independence Party from 1965 to 1969. He was the elder brother of Erkki Leikola.

References

1893 births
1973 deaths
People from Orimattila
People from Uusimaa Province (Grand Duchy of Finland)
People's Party of Finland (1951) politicians
Liberal League (Finland) politicians
Members of the Parliament of Finland (1951–54)
Members of the Parliament of Finland (1954–58)